Bus bridge or variant may refer to:
 Rail replacement bus service
 bridge subtype, reserved or specialized for buses
 Busbar subtype that connects busbars together
 bus (computing) subtype that connects computer buses together
 IBM Bus Bridge, see CoreConnect